Francesco Zabarella (10 August 1360 – 26 September 1417) was an Italian cardinal and canonist.

Appointment as bishop
Born in Padua, he studied jurisprudence at Bologna and at Florence, where he graduated in 1385. He taught Canon law at Florence until 1390 and at Padua until 1410. Having taken minor orders in 1385, he became vicar of bishop Acciajuoli of Florence and pastor at the Church of Santa Maria in Pruncta near Florence. In 1398 he was made archpriest of the cathedral at Padua. The Paduan Government repeatedly employed him on diplomatic missions, and towards the end of 1404, he was one of two ambassadors sent to King Charles VI of France to obtain the latter's assistance against Venice, which was preparing to annex Padua. When Padua had become part of the Venetian Republic in 1406, Zabarella became a loyal supporter of Venice. In 1409 he took part in the Council of Pisa as councilor of the Venetian legate. On 18 July 1410, Pope John XXIII appointed him bishop of Florence and papal referendary, and on 6 June 1411, he made him the Cardinal Deacon of the Titular church of Santi Cosma e Damiano.

Other ventures
His most important literary production is an ecclesiastic-political treatise, De schismate (Strasburg, 1515). It consists of independent portions, written at different intervals from 1403 to 1408, and contains various suggestions for ending the schism.

Zabarella's chief writings in canon law are (with examples of editions):
Lectura super Clementinis (Naples, 1471)
Commentarius in libros Decretalium (Venice, 1502)
Consilia (Venice, 1581)
Also attributed to him but in need of verification:
De felicitate libri III (Padua, 1655)
De arte metrica
De natura rerum diversarum
De corpore Christi

A large number of his letters are in the Österreichische Nationalbibliothek of Vienna, Cod. Lat. 5513. In some, Zabarella is referred to by the title Cardinalis

In music history, Zabarella is noted as the patron of the composer Johannes Ciconia.  Ciconia complimented Zabarella in song, by composing a three-voice isorhythmic motet in his honor, Doctorum Principem/Melodia Suavissima/Vir Mitis, surviving in the manuscript Bologna Q15.

Later career

Though he never received major orders, he was one of the most active and influential cardinals of the Antipope John XXIII, whose interests he supported at the Council of Rome (1412–13). When this council failed to end the lamentable schism, John XXIII sent the cardinals Zabarella and De Challant as legates to King Sigismund (son of Holy Roman Emperor Charles IV, and emperor after 1433) at Como in October, 1413, with full powers to come to an understanding with the latter concerning the place and time for holding a new council. It was arranged to open the new council at Constance on 1 November 1414, where Zabarella was one of the chief supporters of John XXIII. When the latter fled from Constance 20 March 1415, in order to thwart the election of a new pope, Zabarella remained as his representative. It was chiefly through his influence that John XXIII finally resigned the papacy unconditionally in April, 1415. Nevertheless, the Council of Constance continued its proceedings against John, and commissioned Zabarella with four other cardinals to inform him of his suspension, and later of his formal deposition by the council. In the proceedings against the Avignonese Pope Benedict XIII, Zabarella proposed, at the session held 28 November 1416, that Benedict be cited before the council. He also took part in the proceedings of the council against Huss, Jerome of Prague, and Jean Petit. His attempts to induce the two former to sign a softened form of retraction proved useless. From April till the end of July he sought to regain health and strength at a neighbouring watering place. On 28 July he was again at Constance, and up to the time of his death exerted all his influence to hasten the election of a new pope. He is buried in the cathedral at Padua.

Works 

 De schismate, Strasbourg, 1515.
 Lectura super Clementinis, Naples, 1471.
 Commentaria in quinque libros decretalium, Venice, 1502.
 
 
 
 
 
 Consilia juris
 
 De felicitate libri III, Padua, 1655.
 De arte metrica
 De natura rerum diversarum
 De corpore Christi
 Commentarium in Clementinas
 Repetitiones

References

Sources

 Thomas E. Morrissey, Conciliarism and Church Law in the Fifteenth Century, Farnham: Variorum, 2014.
 Dieter Girgensohn, Francesco Zabarella aus Padua, Wien: Böhlau, 1993.

External links
 

Attribution

1360 births
1417 deaths
University of Bologna alumni
University of Florence alumni
Clergy from Padua
Canon law jurists
15th-century Italian cardinals
15th-century Italian Roman Catholic bishops
14th-century Italian Roman Catholic priests
Bishops of Florence
14th-century Italian jurists
15th-century Italian jurists
15th-century Latin writers